Pyrausta obtusanalis is a moth in the family Crambidae. It was described by Druce in 1899. It is found in Mexico (Jalapa), southern California and Arizona.

References

Moths described in 1899
obtusanalis
Moths of North America